Luckner can refer to

Michael Lückner, German musician
Nicolas Luckner (1722–1794), German military officer in French service
Felix von Luckner, grandson of Nicolas
 Several "Luckner" Ultra Heavy Tanks have been constructed, both as models, and in computer wargames, by a number of different fantasy wargame producers, as a tribute Felix von Luckner status as a "good guy" war hero.